Shaky is an album released by Shakin' Stevens in 1981. Released at the peak of his popularity, Shaky was the first and, to date, only UK number 1 album for Shakin' Stevens.  The album features three top ten singles, most notably Green Door, which enjoyed a month at number one during the summer of 1981.  Despite Shaky's reputation as a rock and roll cover artist, the album contained five of his own compositions as well as the original song "You Drive Me Crazy", which spent four weeks at number two in the UK singles chart in the spring of 1981.  A cover of "It's Raining", released in the autumn, also managed to reach the top ten in the UK.

Produced by Stuart Colman, the album retained most of the musicians from Shaky's previous album, notably Mickey Gee, BJ Cole and Geraint Watkins, and was again recorded at the Eden Studios in Chiswick.

The album was issued in Australia under the title Green Door with a slightly different track listing where it was also released on CD in the early 1990s.  In Europe, it was only officially released on CD for the first time in 2009 as part of The Epic Masters box set.

Track listing

Personnel
Produced by Stuart Colman
Recorded at Eden Studios
Engineer – Rod Houison
Assisted by Nick Froome, Neill King

Musicians
Mickey Gee – lead and rhythm guitars
Stuart Colman – bass
Roger McKew – guitars
Howard Tibble – drums
Geraint Watkins – piano
Tony Hall – tenor saxophone
Sid Phillips – tenor and baritone saxophones
B.J. Cole – steel guitar

Charts

Weekly charts

Year-end charts

Certifications and sales

References

1981 albums
Epic Records albums
Shakin' Stevens albums